The 1840 United States presidential election in North Carolina took place between October 30 and December 2, 1840, as part of the 1840 United States presidential election. Voters chose 15 representatives, or electors to the Electoral College, who voted for President and Vice President.

North Carolina voted for the Whig candidate, William Henry Harrison, over Democratic candidate Martin Van Buren. Harrison won North Carolina by a margin of 15.36%.

With 57.68% of the popular vote, North Carolina would prove to be Harrison's fifth strongest state after Kentucky, Vermont, Rhode Island and Louisiana.

Results

References

North Carolina
1840
1840 North Carolina elections